The Diagnostic Society of Edinburgh is a debating society in Edinburgh, Scotland. The Diagnostic Society was founded in 1816 and subsequently absorbed the Dialectic Society established in 1787 from which it takes its foundation date. It claims to be the oldest society in Edinburgh and also the oldest debating society in the UK. The Society traditionally meets on Thursday evenings by candlelight in black tie. Meetings consist of  “the prosecution of literary and philosophical composition, criticism, and debate,"  although in modern times the introduction of parliamentary debating style has put more focus on wit, theatrics and eccentricity.

References 

Student debating societies
1816 establishments in Scotland
Clubs and societies of the University of Edinburgh